The Premier League Save of the Season is an annual English football award, presented to the goalkeeper deemed to have made the best save in the preceding Premier League season. For sponsorship purposes, it was called the Castrol Save of the Season since its inception during the 2021–22 season. In 2022, the Premier League Save of the Season was first awarded, with Jordan Pickford of Everton its inaugural recipient.

Winners

Awards won by nationality

Awards won by club

See also

 Premier League Golden Boot
 Premier League Golden Glove

References

Assists
Premier League trophies and awards
Association football player non-biographical articles